The Madoitja or Tjupany were an Aboriginal Australian people of Western Australia.

Language
The Madoitja language was one of the Wati languages.

Location
Their southern confines lay around Cunyu, touching on the northwestern border of Millrose. They lay north-northeast of the Wajarri.

Alternative names
 Konin.
 Marduidji.
 Milamada.
 Wainawonga
 Waula. (Pini exonym meaning "northerners.")

Notes

Citations

Sources

Aboriginal peoples of Western Australia